Play America is an extended play by Norwegian electronic band Flunk, released in 2005 on Beatservice Records. The album features the songs only available on the US edition of Morning Star, released by Kriztal Entertainment, as well as remixes.

Track listing
 Play
 Skysong
 True Faith (Live studio recording)
 Probably
 All My Dreams on Hold
 I've Been Waiting All My Life to Leave You (Elektrofant's DX-7 Remix)
 Play (Athome Project Kanskjedeterhåplikevel Remix)
 Play (Slowpho Opp Av Godstolen Remix)
 All Day And All of the Night (Tronso & Nils Noa Remix)
 Morning Star (Parliavox Remix)

2005 albums
Flunk albums